Forever 1 is the seventh Korean studio album and  by South Korean girl group Girls' Generation. It was released digitally on August 5 and physically on August 8, 2022, by SM Entertainment to commemorate the group's fifteenth anniversary since their debut in 2007. Forever 1 is Girls' Generation first music release in five years, following their hiatus after the release of their sixth Korean studio album Holiday Night (2017). The album contains 10 tracks, including the lead single of the same name.

Background and release
On May 17, 2022, SM Entertainment announced that Girls' Generation would be returning for their fifteenth anniversary with a new album in August, ending their five year hiatus. On July 4, member Sooyoung teased on tvN's Take Care of Me This Week that the group would be releasing their seventh studio album. On July 24, SM Entertainment announced that the group would be releasing their seventh studio album, titled Forever 1, on August 8. One day later, the promotional schedule was released, with the digital version of the album to be released on August 5, three days earlier than the physical release, to commemorate the fifteenth anniversary. On July 27, it was announced that Forever 1 would contain ten tracks, including lead single "Forever 1". Songwriter Kenzie, who previously helped write the group's singles "Into The New World" (2007), "Oh!" (2010), and "All Night" (2017), announced to be participating in the album's production. Two days later, the album's mood sampler was released. Music video teasers for "Forever 1" were released on July 4 and 5. The album was released digitally alongside the music video for "Forever 1" on August 5.

Composition
Forever 1 consists of ten tracks. The lead single "Forever 1" was described as dance-pop song with "energetic melody" and "exciting festival-like atmosphere" with lyrics about "eternal love for precious people who give strength anytime and anywhere". The second track, "Lucky Like That", is a pop song characterized by "strong guitar performance and powerful drum beats". The third track, "Seventeen", is an R&B dance song with a "synth sound, heavy drum beats, and light piano melody"; members Tiffany and Sooyoung participating write lyrics for the song. The fourth track "Villain" was described as a dance song with "heavy bass and drum beat", with lyrics written by Tiffany and Sooyoung and the former also participating the composition. The fifth track, "You Better Run", is an electropop song with "sharp sound and strong vocals" and lyrics about "a main character who returns and making the opponent fall into fear after foretelling revenge earlier", labeled a continuation from the group's 2010 single "Run Devil Run".

"Closer" was described as a pop song with "light piano riff and sensual disco rhythm" and "an exciting vibe". "Mood Lamp," the seventh track, is an R&B song with a "soft guitar melody that creates a warm atmosphere" and lyrics that "compare the desire to protect a loved one from darkness to a scene where a mood lamp softly illuminates the bedside". The eighth track, "Summer Night", was described as medium-tempo pop song characterized by "bouncing synth and beautiful melody". The ninth track, "Freedom", is a "dreamy" synth-pop song with "rich harmony" and lyrics "about discovering who you really are and feeling free when you are with the person you love". The last track, "Paper Plane", was described as a medium-tempo pop song with "heavy bass and a cheerful flux synth" and lyrics containing "warm messages of supports for those who endlessly pursue their dreams with paper airplanes".

Commercial performance
Forever 1 debuted at number two on South Korea's Circle Album Chart in the chart issue dated August 7–13, 2022; on the monthly chart, the album debuted at number five in the chart issue dated August 2022. In Japan, the album debuted at number 18 on the Billboard Japan Hot Albums in the chart issue dated August 10, 2022. On the Oricon's chart, the album debuted at number 14 on the Albums Chart in the chart issue dated August 29, 2022; on the monthly chart, the album debuted at number 48 in the chart issue dated August 2022. The album also debuted at number four on the Digital Albums Chart in the chart issue dated August 15, 2022, and number 48 on the Combined Albums Chart in the chart issue dated August 22, 2022. It ascended to number nine on the Oricon Albums Chart, and number eight on the Combined Albums Chart in the chart issue dated September 12, 2022.

In United States, Forever 1 debuted at number 16 on the Billboard Heatseekers Album, and number 88 on the Billboard Top Current Album Sales in the chart issue dated August 20, 2022. In United Kingdom, the album debuted at position 28 on the OCC's UK Digital Albums in the chart issue dated August 12–18, 2022. In Australia, the album debuted at number ten on the ARIA Top 50 Digital Albums Chart, and number one on the ARIA Top 20 Hitseekers Albums Chart in the chart issue dated August 15, 2022.

Critical reception

Forever 1 received generally positive reviews by critics. In a four-star review, Tanu I. Raj of NME described Forever 1 as "a revisit of their classic sounds and songs that were recast into a more modern, mature image, creating a charming medley of the past and the present". Joshua Minsoo Kim of Pitchfork praised the album for being a "concise record" and named it among Girls' Generation's best due to the group's "lack of musical identity compared to their juniors, making them as versatile as ever".

Promotion
Prior to the release of Forever 1, on August 5, 2022, the group held a live event called "Girls' Generation 'Forever 1' Countdown Live" on YouTube and TikTok to introduce the album and to commemorate their fifteenth anniversary with their fans.

Track listing

Credits and personnel
Credits adapted from album's liner notes.

Studio
 SM Lvyin Studio – recording , mixing , digital editing 
 SM Yellow Tail Studio – recording , digital editing 
 SM Ssam Studio – recording , digital editing , engineered for mix 
 SM Big Shot Studio – recording , mixing 
 MonoTree Studio – recording 
 SM Blue Ocean Studio – mixing 
 SM Blue Cup Studio – mixing 
 SM Concert Hall Studio – mixing 
 SM Starlight Studio – mixing , digital editing 
 821 Sound Mastering – mastering 
 Sound Pool Studios – digital editing 
 Doobdoob Studio – digital editing 

Personnel

 SM Entertainment – executive producer
 Lee Soo-man – producer
 Kenzie – producer , director , lyrics , composition , arrangement , vocal directing 
 Lee Sung-soo – production director, executive supervisor
 Tak Young-joon – executive supervisor
 Yoo Young-jin – music and sound supervisor
 Girls' Generation – vocals , background vocals 
 Taeyeon – background vocals 
 Sooyoung – background vocals , lyrics 
 Tiffany – background vocals , lyrics , composition , vocal directing 
 Seohyun – background vocals 
 Yuri – background vocals 
 Ylva Dimberg – background vocals, composition 
 Lee Yu-ra – background vocals 
 Josh Cumbee – background vocals, composition, arrangement 
 Grace Tither – background vocals, composition 
 Kyle MacKenzie – background vocals, composition, arrangement 
 Keir MacCulloch – background vocals, composition, arrangement 
 Kwon Ye-jin – background vocals 
 Choi Hae-jin – background vocals 
 Gabriella Bishop – background vocals, composition 
 St. Louis – background vocals, arrangement 
 Jeon Ae-jin – background vocals 
 Moa "Cazzi Opeia" Carlebecker – background vocals, composition 
 Hwang Yu-bin (Verygoods) – lyrics 
 Lee On-eul – lyrics 
 Moon Hye-min – lyrics 
 Jo Yoon-kyung – lyrics 
 Yun (153/Joombas) – lyrics 
 Jeong Ha-ri (153/Joombas) – lyrics 
 Charlie (153/Joombas) – lyrics 
  – composition, arrangement 
 Linnea Deb – composition 
 David Strääf – composition 
 Daniel "Obi" Klein – composition, arrangement 
 Charli Taft – composition 
 Andreas Öberg – composition 
 Emily Kim – composition 
 Katya Edwards – composition 
 Peter Wallevik – composition 
 Daniel Davidsen – composition 
 Katy Tizzard – composition 
 Joe Killington – composition 
 Jamie Jones – composition, arrangement 
 Jack Kugell – composition, arrangement 
 Lamont Neuble – composition, arrangement 
 Tim Stewart – composition, arrangement 
 Treasure Davis – composition 
 Royal Dive – composition, arrangement 
 Sofia Kay – composition 
 Camden Cox – composition 
 Cameron Warren – composition 
 Fredrik "Figge" Hakan Boström – composition, arrangement 
 Moonshine – arrangement 
 Imlay – arrangement 
 PhD – arrangement 
 Lee Ji-hong – recording, digital editing 
 Noh Min-ji – recording , digital editing 
 Kang Eun-ji – recording , digital editing , engineered for mix 
 Lee Min-kyu – recording , mixing 
 Lee Joo-hyung – recording, vocal directing, Pro Tools 
 Choo Dae-gwan – recording , vocal directing , Pro Tools 
 G-high – recording , vocal directing , Pro Tools 
 Kim Chul-soon – mixing 
 Jeong Ui-seok – mixing 
 Nam Gung-jin – mixing 
 Lee Ji-heung – mixing 
 Jeong Yu-ra – mixing , digital editing 
 Kwon Nam-woo – mastering 
 Kriz – vocal directing 
 Kim Yeo-seo – vocal directing 
 Jeong Ho-jin – digital editing 
 Kwon Yoo-jin – digital editing 
 Kang Sun-young – digital editing

Charts

Weekly charts

Monthly charts

Year-end chart

Certifications and sales

Release history

See also
 List of certified albums in South Korea

References

Girls' Generation albums
2022 albums
Korean-language albums
SM Entertainment albums